Beas Airport  is a civil aerodrome located in Amritsar, Punjab in India. The airport is the main base of private jets of Radha Soami and used exclusively for their personal travel. As of now, the airport does not serve any scheduled flight operations. The nearest airport to Beas Airport is Sri Guru Ram Dass Jee International Airport, the primary airport serving Amritsar.

Area 
The Airport is spread over an 497,214 m2 and perimeter length of 6043 metre.

Future Plans 
There are plans to start scheduled flight operations from the airport in future. Ministry of Civil Aviation has identified Beas airport under its UDAN-Regional Connectivity Scheme. The airlines would be permitted to run short flights of less than 1 hour on these routes and the fare has been capped at Rs. 2500, in order to promote regional connectivity scheme.

Satellite Airport 
Due to the fast pace of growing aviation industry in India, it is projected that over 31 cities will need 2nd airport by 2040. Beas Airport can act as a 'satellite airport' or 'second airport' serving Amritsar after SGRDJ-Amritsar International Airport.

References

Airports in Punjab, India
Airports with year of establishment missing
Transport in Amritsar